Léon Broutin (fl. 1865–77) was a French writer of vaudevilles and cabaret song texts.
 Vive Lille!! - A mes amis A. Briffaut et E. Lépine. Paroles de Émile Duhem, Léon Broutin, musique de d'Émile Duhem.
 La Maison ensorcelée.  1865
 Le Docteur Sans Pareil!!! ou la médication universelle 1865
 La Muse au cabaret. Chansons nouvelles, par Léon Broutin 1866
 Le Tambour-major. - C'est-à-s'en lécher les doigts. - Chansons par Léon Broutin
 A ma Soeur, couplets chantés le 25 septembre 1877 Léon Broutin - 1877
 Quéqu'part, chansonnette... paroles de Léon Broutin, musique de d'Émile Duhem.

References

External  links
 Vive Lille!!

1880s deaths
Year of birth missing
French male writers